is a train station in the town of Kawanehon, Haibara District, Shizuoka Prefecture, Japan, operated by the Ōigawa Railway.

Lines

Station layout
The station has a single side platform joined to an island platform by a level crossing. Only two tracks are in regular use, with the track on the far side of the island platform and a shunt track used for maintenance and for freight services. The small station building is staffed.

Adjacent stations

|-
!colspan=5|Ōigawa Railway

Station history
Kawane-Ryōgoku Station was opened on August 1, 1959. The main rail yard for the Ōigawa Railway is located at this station.

Passenger statistics
In fiscal 2017, the station was used by an average of 3 passengers daily (boarding passengers only).

Surrounding area
Oi River

See also
 List of Railway Stations in Japan

References

External links

 Ōigawa Railway home page

Stations of Ōigawa Railway
Railway stations in Shizuoka Prefecture
Railway stations in Japan opened in 1959
Kawanehon, Shizuoka